Yuri Sazonoff is a contemporary Canadian composer and music producer who writes music for film, television, concert and theatre. His specialty is high-end orchestral and cutting-edge hybrid music scores, ethnic music, and electronic and ambient genres. In addition to scoring for film and television, he is often involved in rock, pop and classical crossover projects. His name has appeared on numerous record releases, including those with EMI, Universal Music, Sony Music, Solitudes and Avalon.

References 

 Juno Awards of 2006

External links 
 
 

Canadian film score composers
Male film score composers
Russian musicians
Living people
Place of birth missing (living people)
Year of birth missing (living people)